Berberis haematocarpa, Woot. with the common names red barberry, red Mexican barbery, Colorado barberry and Mexican barberry, is a species in the Barberry family in southwestern North America.  It is also sometimes called algerita, but that name is more often applied to its relative, Mahonia trifoliolata.

Distribution and habitat
It grows on rocky slopes and canyons of mountains, in Pinyon-juniper woodlands, grasslands, and desert chaparral. It is found on slopes and mesas in Arizona, New Mexico, Colorado, Texas, and Sonora. It is also native to sky island habitats of the Mojave Desert in California and southwestern Nevada.

Description

It has thick, rigid  pinnate leaves of several centimeters long. Each is made up of a few thick 3-7 lance-shaped leaflets with very spiny toothed edges. They are a glaucus whitish-gray in color, due to a thick cuticle of wax.

The inflorescences bear 3 to 5 bright yellow flowers, each with nine sepals and six petals all arranged in whorls of three. The plant blooms from February to June.

Taxonomy
The compound leaves place this species in the group sometimes segregated as the genus Mahonia, and classified as Mahonia haematocarpa.

Uses
Native Americans of the Apache tribe used the plant's wood shavings for a yellow dye and as a traditional eye medicine, and it's fresh and preserved fruit for food.

References

External links
Calflora Database: Berberis haematocarpa (red fruited mahonia)
UC Photos gallery: Berberis haematocarpa

haematocarpa
Flora of the Southwestern United States
Flora of New Mexico
Flora of Sonora
Flora of Texas
Flora of the California desert regions
Natural history of the Mojave Desert
Plants used in Native American cuisine
Plants used in traditional Native American medicine
Plants described in 1898
Flora without expected TNC conservation status